St. Elizabeth's is a Roman Catholic church in Nuremberg in southern Germany. It is dedicated to Elizabeth of Hungary.

History
The chapel in the free imperial city of Nuremberg was dedicated to Elizabeth of Hungary in 1235. After the Reformation, this was the only Roman Catholic church in the Protestant city of Nuremberg. It soon became inadequate for its congregation, and the church entered into protracted negotiations with the city magistrate, which lasted from 1718 to 1780. Finally agreement was reached for a new church, and the old one was demolished in 1784.

Franz Ignaz Michael Neumann, son of Balthasar Neumann, drew up plans for the new building. The foundation stone was laid on 19 May 1785. Neumann died on 29 September 1789, and responsibility was taken over by Peter Anton von Verschaffelt. However, a large overrun in costs led to the resignation of Verschaffelt in 1789. Eventually topping off was completed in 1802 and in 1803 the dome was crowned with a golden cross.

In 1806 the church was secularised. On 27 January 1885, the Roman Catholic Archdiocese of Bamberg purchased the church, and further work was done to complete the church to the original plans. It was eventually completed in 1903.

References

Elizabeth
Elizabeth
1230s establishments in the Holy Roman Empire
1235 establishments in Europe
Roman Catholic churches completed in 1903
20th-century Roman Catholic church buildings in Germany